Youri Roseboom (born 19 January 2000) is a Dutch footballer.

Career statistics

Club

Notes

References

2000 births
Living people
Dutch footballers
Association football forwards
SBV Vitesse players
NEC Nijmegen players
Achilles '29 players
De Treffers players
FC Eindhoven players
Tweede Divisie players
Eerste Divisie players
Expatriate footballers in Poland